The Maramureș Mountains Natural Park is a protected area (natural park category V IUCN) situated in Romania, in the north part in the Maramureș County.

See also 
 Protected areas of Romania
 Rodna National Park

References

External links
 Encyclopedia of Ukraine: Maramureş Basin
 Encyclopedia of Ukraine: Maramureş-Bukovynian Upland
 Carpathian Mountains: Division (map)

Protected areas of Romania
Geography of Maramureș County
Protected areas established in 2005
Tourist attractions in Maramureș County